John Brian Conrey (23 June 1955) is an American mathematician and the executive director of the American Institute of Mathematics. His research interests are in number theory, specifically analysis of L-functions and the Riemann zeta function.

Education
Conrey received his B.S. from Santa Clara University in 1976 and received his Ph.D. at the University of Michigan in 1980 under the supervision of Hugh Lowell Montgomery.

Career
Conrey is the founding executive director of the American Institute of Mathematics, a position he has held since 1997. Since 2005, he has been part-time professor at the University of Bristol, England.

He is on the editorial board of the Journal of Number Theory.

Research
With Bui and Young, Conrey proved in 2011 that more than 41 percent of the zeros of the Riemann zeta function are on the critical line.

With Jonathan Keating, Nina Snaith, and others, Conrey researched correlations of eigenvalues of random unitary matrices and Riemann zeta zeros.

Awards and honors
The American Mathematical Society jointly awarded him the eighth annual Levi L. Conant Prize for expository writing in 2008 for The Riemann Hypothesis.  In 2015 he was elected as a Fellow of the American Mathematical Society.

References

External links

20th-century American mathematicians
21st-century American mathematicians
Number theorists
Academics of the University of Bristol
Living people
Santa Clara University alumni
University of Michigan alumni
Fellows of the American Mathematical Society
1955 births